Bmahray, is a village in the Aley District in Lebanon. It lies 41 km south-East of Beirut at an altitude of 1215m above sea level.

Demography
Bmahray's residents are Maronite, Druze and Greek Catholic communities. The 2010 municipal elections census counted 1018 registered voters, The village's religious buildings are Saint George Maronite church and a Druze Khalwa.

Bmahray's main families are:
 Abou Zakhem
Bou Malhab / Bou Malham
 Al Abanni
 Saab
 Abou Chahine
 Abou Ghanem
 Moukamer
 Daou
 Jreidy
 Nakhle
 Rabah
 Malkoun

Geography
Bmahray is located on the western face of Mount Lebanon.

Archaeology

Bmahray contains the remains of Roman monuments and rock sarcophagi.

Economy

Bmahray has no schools, no hospitals or medical institutions and no institutions counting more than 5 employees.

Before the Lebanese civil war, the main source of income for the villagers was horticulture, especially apples; the lack of water for irrigation failed attempts to revitalize this economic activity.

Government and Politics

Some residents are affiliated with March 14 Movement with others affiliated  to the Free Patriotic Movement, and the Progressive Socialist Party. The mayor is Joseph Malkoun since 1998.

Environment
Bmahray was one of the first villages to become part of the Shouf Cedar Biosphere Reserve. It has one million square meters of cedar trees, as well as at least three million square meters of pine trees.

References

External links

Bmahray, Localiban

Populated places in Aley District
Maronite Christian communities in Lebanon
Druze communities in Lebanon
Melkite Christian communities in Lebanon